was a town in Kitakatsushika District, Saitama Prefecture, Japan.

On October 1, 2005, Shōwa was merged into the expanded city of Kasukabe and no longer exists as an independent municipality.

Dissolved municipalities of Saitama Prefecture
Kasukabe, Saitama